The 1968 Cornell Big Red football team was an American football team that represented Cornell University during the 1968 NCAA University Division football season. Cornell finished second-from-last in the Ivy League.

In its third season under head coach Jack Musick, the team compiled a 3–6 record and was outscored 163 to 130. Doug Kleiber was the team captain.

Cornell's 1–6 conference record placed seventh in the Ivy League standings. The Big Red was outscored 147 to 96 by Ivy opponents.

Cornell played its home games at Schoellkopf Field in Ithaca, New York.

Schedule

References

Cornell
Cornell Big Red football seasons
Cornell Big Red football